Mid Calder is a village in West Lothian, Scotland. The settlement has been on a major crossroads since its origin some time in the 11th century.

History

In the 14th century, during the Wars of Scottish Independence, Sir James de Sandilands distinguished himself in the wars against the English. For his services he was rewarded with a royal charter of his lands by David II of Scotland. James was well connected and married Eleanor, the only daughter of Sir Archibald Douglas, Regent of Scotland. The gift included extensive estates in what is now West Lothian, and the Barony of Calder. After the Reformation in 1560, Sir James Sandilands, the head of the Sandilands family, was created Lord Torphichen. Since 1348 the family seat has been at Calder House, near to the middle of the village.

For centuries a large part of the economy of the Scottish Highlands revolved around the breeding and trading of Highland cattle. They were moved along drove roads from all parts of the country, including some of the islands, to trysts or markets held in Crieff and Falkirk. Most of the cattle would then be driven south to feed consumers in England. Several of the drove routes used came together at Mid Calder. Huge herds of cattle would come across fords or bridges over the River Almond before crossing the Pentland Hills to West Linton. The peak year was 1840 when some 150,000 cattle passed through the area over the three months from August to October. This traffic helped support no fewer than nine public houses in the village. One example is the original Torphichen Inn on bank Street (now named the Fork and Field), the building dates to 1763 and was paid for by the Lords Torphichen. 

In the 17th century, Mid Calder was the site of several witch hunts, including the torture and death by burning of several alleged 'witches' at Cunnigar Hill in Mid Calder (still known locally as Witches’ Knowe).

Meanwhile, Mid Calder also lay on the main turnpike road from Edinburgh to Glasgow, adding a steady flow of east–west traffic to the seasonal influx of drovers heading south. However, the importance of the turnpike lessened at the same time as the cattle droving stopped, and for the same reason: the railways. And for once the acumen and foresight that had allowed the Sandilands to retain their position for so many centuries missed a beat. When the railway came to West Lothian in 1848, the then Lord Torphichen decreed that it should not come near Calder House. As a result, Mid Calder was served by a station at Kirknewton, three miles away which was called Mid Calder until 1982. This meant that adapting to the loss of its traditional sources of income could have been difficult for the village. But at precisely the right moment the world's first oil boom occurred, in West Lothian. This was based on oil extracted from shale, and by 1870 over 3 million tons of shale were being mined each year in the area around Mid Calder. Output declined with the discovery of liquid oil reserves around the world in the early 1900s, but shale mining only finally ceased in 1962. The "bings" that characterise oil shale mining elsewhere in West Lothian have largely been flattened around Mid Calder and the land reclaimed for recreation, industry and housing. Many of the buildings on Main street and Bank Street in the village were built during the shale oil boom period.

Another major factor leading to Mid Calder's current prosperity has been the dramatic growth of nearby Livingston, now the second largest settlement in the Lothians and whose main shopping centre is only a mile to the west. The outlying areas of Mid Calder were heavily built upon in the 1980s, and as a result, housing estates are now nearby to both Calder House and woodlands.

In 2005, Mid Calder was subject to unwanted publicity when it became the first place in Britain to issue an ASBO in a village-wide crackdown on the anti-social behaviour of drunken teenagers. The ASBO allowed police to disperse any young person found outdoors. After one month of operation, the order was deemed a success.

Governance

Mid Calder, along with the rest of West Lothian, is an SNP and Labour marginal seat.

In West Lothian council, Mid Calder is part of the East Livingston and East Calder Ward and is represented by four councillors. who are Carl John (SNP), Frank Anderson (SNP), Damian Timson (Conservative) and Dave King (Labour).

Mid Calder is part of the Almond Valley Constituency since 1999 and is represented by the SNP's Angela Constance who has held the seat since 2007 when the constituency was called Livingston.

Mid Calder has been part of the Livingston UK Parliament constituency since 1983. Mid Calder is now represented by Hannah Bardell (SNP) who has held the seat since the United Kingdom general election 2015.

Prior to Brexit in 2020 it was part of the Scotland European Parliament constituency.

Public Services
The local police force for Mid Calder is Police Scotland and the village is in East Livingston and East Calder policing ward. Following the closure of the police station that was located on Market Street in Mid Calder, the policing ward's station is at Broxburn.

Waste collection services are provided by West Lothian Council. Water and Sewage services are provided by Scottish Water.

Community Facilities
Mid Calder community centre (with a public hall and meeting rooms) is located on Market Street. The Kirk of Calder also has a community hall known as the Glenalmond Hall which was purchased in 1990 to host church events for the local community.

Mid Calder is also home to Lodge St John Mid Calder number 272 on the Roll of the Grand Lodge of Scotland. This Freemason lodge was formed on 4 May 1818 (although Freemasonry was active in the area since at least the 1750s). Since 1936 the lodge has owned its own building at the entrance of the Calder Wood Country Park.

Transport

Mid Calder is served by regular bus services connecting it to other parts of West Lothian and Edinburgh. McGill's Scotland East's X22 route connects Mid Calder to Edinburgh and Shotts, via Livingston. Lothian Country's routes X27 and X28 connecting with Bathgate via Livingston to the west, both running to Regent Road, Edinburgh to the east. The night service, N28, runs one journey per night to Bathgate via Livingston. E&M Horsburgh service 40/X40 connects St Johns Hospital and Edinburgh Royal Infirmary.

Education
The two primary schools for local children are Mid Calder Primary School (on Main St) and nearby East Calder Primary School.

The nearest secondary schools are  The James Young High School and St. Margaret's RC Academy in Livingston.

Religion
The Kirk of Calder is a Ashlar stone Gothic style Church of Scotland church in Mid Calder. The present Kirk dates from 1541 but was built on the site of an earlier 12th century church. The church was commissioned, designed and paid for by the Sandilands family of the adjacent Calder house. The transepts and belfry were added in 1863. The adjacent manse house on Main Street is named Brewery House and has an 18th-century exterior with evidence of an earlier building inside.

Media
The local paid newspaper is the West Lothian Courier (Daily Record). Residents also receive the West Lothian Bulletin, a free publication, up to four times a year. On a wider scale there is Edinburgh's local paid newspaper which is the Edinburgh Evening News.

The local BBC radio stations are BBC Radio Scotland and the Scottish Gaelic station BBC Radio nan Gàidheal. Local commercial radio includes Forth One and Capital FM Scotland. The local television regions are BBC Scotland and STV Central.

Notable people
 Angus McLagan, New Zealand cabinet minister
 Rev John Spottiswood and his son John Spottiswoode, archbishop of St. Andrews
 George Smith RSA, artist, born and raised in Mid Calder

Notes

References

External links

 Local History Link 

Villages in West Lothian
Parishes formerly in Midlothian